The Ohrid Swimming Marathon (Macedonian: Охридски Пливачки Маратон, Ohridski Plivački Maraton) is an international Open water swimming competition, established in always taking place in the waters of the Ohrid Lake, Republic of North Macedonia. The swimmers are supposed to swim 30 km from Sveti Naum to the Ohrid harbor.

The 2008 Marathon

The 2008 competition was the 22nd edition of the Ohrid Swimming Marathon. Prior to the event the Swimming Federation o of Macedonia announced that in 2008 there will be about 25 competitors, of which six are from the Republic of Macedonia itself and several other swimmers from other countries including Argentina, Bulgaria or Slovenia. The winner of the marathon was Bulgarian swimmer Petar Stoychev.

Past winners

References 

Sport in Ohrid
Sports festivals in Yugoslavia
Festivals in North Macedonia